Case Concerning the Arrest Warrant of 11 April 2000 (Democratic Republic of the Congo v Belgium) [2002] ICJ 1 was a public international law case before the International Court of Justice (ICJ) with a judgment issued on 14 February 2002.

Facts
In 1993, the Belgian Parliament voted a "law of universal jurisdiction" to allow it to judge people accused of war crimes, crimes against humanity or genocide. In 2001, four people from Rwanda were convicted and given sentences from 12 to 20 years' imprisonment for their involvement in 1994 Rwandan genocide. There was quickly an explosion of suits deposed.

An arrest warrant issued in 2000 under this law against Abdoulaye Yerodia Ndombasi, Minister of Foreign Affairs of the Democratic Republic of the Congo, was challenged before the International Court of Justice in the case entitled Arrest Warrant of 11 April 2000 (Democratic Republic of the Congo v. Belgium).

Judgment
On 14 February 2002, the judgment was handed down, and the ICJ issued a press release:

The court limited the scope of its judgment to the immunity from criminal jurisdiction and the inviolability of an incumbent minister for foreign affairs and that as none of the treaties brought to the attention of the court covered this issue that the court must decide the issue based on customary international law. But it rejected Belgium's argument that because the parties had not raised the issue of "the disputed arrest warrant, issued by the Belgian investigating judge in exercise of his purported universal jurisdiction, complied in that regard with the rules and principles of international law governing the jurisdiction of national courts, because that question was not contained in the final submissions of the Parties." and concluded that this did not stop the court dealing with certain aspects of that question in the reasoning of its Judgment.

Referring to the few existing decisions of national high courts, such as the House of Lords and the French Court of Cassation they concluded that immunity was not granted to state officials for their own benefit, but to ensure the effective performance of their functions on behalf of their respective state; and when abroad that they enjoy full immunity from arrest in another state on criminal charges including charges of war crimes or crimes against humanity.

The court noted that this immunity from jurisdiction of a foreign national court, existed even when foreign national courts exercise an extended criminal jurisdiction on the basis of various international conventions that covered the prevention and punishment of certain serious crimes. However the court emphasized that "While jurisdictional immunity is procedural in nature, criminal responsibility is a question of substantive law. Jurisdictional immunity may well bar prosecution for a certain period or for certain offences; it cannot exonerate the person to whom it applies from all criminal responsibility."

See also
 List of International Court of Justice cases

References
 
 ICJ rejects Belgian arrest warrant for foreign ministers of Democratic Republic of Congo, United Nations Information Service.  Copy of The International Court of Justice, Press Release 2002/042002 issued on 14 February 2002

Further reading
 Press release 2000/32 International Court of Justice [17 October] 2000.  The Democratic Republic of the Congo institutes proceedings against Belgium concerning an international arrest warrant issued by a Belgian examining judge against the DRC's acting Minister for Foreign Affairs.  The DRC seises the Court of a request for a provisional measure seeking to have the arrest warrant withdrawn forthwith.
 ICJ's decision
 separate and dissenting opinions
 separate opinion of President Guillaume
 dissenting opinion of Judge Oda

Footnotes

International Court of Justice cases
Law of the Democratic Republic of the Congo
International criminal law
2002 in case law
Belgium–Democratic Republic of the Congo relations
2000 in international relations
2002 in Belgium
2002 in the Democratic Republic of the Congo
2002 in international relations